Diamante Crispino (born 5 September 1994) is an Italian football player.

Club career
He made his Serie C debut for Como on 22 December 2013 in a game against Pavia.

On 16 January 2019, he signed with Siracusa.

On 27 June 2019, Crispino signed with Casertana.

On 7 September 2020 he joined Virtus Francavilla on a 2-year contract.

References

External links
 

1994 births
People from Caserta
Footballers from Campania
Living people
Italian footballers
S.S.C. Napoli players
Como 1907 players
Casertana F.C. players
Virtus Francavilla Calcio players
Serie B players
Serie C players
Association football goalkeepers
Sportspeople from the Province of Caserta